Warren Powers  (born February 4, 1965) is a former American football defensive end in the National Football League (NFL) for the Denver Broncos, the Los Angeles Rams and the Los Angeles Raiders. Powers played college football for the University of Maryland, College Park

He currently heads the "One Nation" team as a National Sales Director at Primerica Financial Services.

College career
Powers made All ACC in his senior year at Maryland.

External links
 

1965 births
Living people
American football defensive ends
Denver Broncos players
Los Angeles Raiders players
Los Angeles Rams players
Maryland Terrapins football players
Primerica
Players of American football from Baltimore